Joe R. Campa Jr. is a retired United States Navy sailor who served as the 11th Master Chief Petty Officer of the Navy.

Early life and education
Campa was born in Lynwood, California and grew up in Southern California. Campa is a distinguished honor graduate of the United States Navy Senior Enlisted Academy. He also graduated from the United States Army Sergeants Major Academy in May 2003 and completed the Command Sergeants Major course. He holds a Bachelor of Science degree from Excelsior University. In March 2006 he graduated from the Naval War College with a Master of Arts degree in National Security and Strategic Studies.

Naval career
Campa enlisted in the United States Navy on 2 June 1980. He completed Recruit Training and Hospital Corpsman "A" School in San Diego, California.

Campa's duty assignments include , San Diego; Naval Medical Center, San Diego, California; Seventh Marine Regiment, First Marine Division, Camp Pendleton; Naval Hospital, Long Beach, California; Third Force Service Support Group, Fleet Marine Force, Okinawa, Japan; Naval Hospital Bremerton, Washington; First Force Service Support Group during the Gulf War;  San Diego, California; and Naval Training Center, Great Lakes, Illinois.

Campa was selected to the command master chief program in May 1999.

During his tour aboard Curtis Wilbur, the ship deployed to the North Arabian Sea in support of Operation Enduring Freedom. He was then the command master chief at Joint Task Force Guantanamo Bay, Cuba. He was sworn in as Master Chief Petty Officer of the Navy (MCPON) 11 in July 2006.

As MCPON, Campa will be best remembered for "resetting" the Chief Petty Officers' Mess, changing the role of the chiefs from the perceived Naval Officer duties and functions they were carrying out, to more a role of "Deckplate Leadership," where chiefs are expected to "be on deck with their Sailors, directly leading & mentoring them and being the technical expert of their equipment." He created the chiefs' "Mission, Vision and Guiding Principles," a written set of expectations and guidance on how to conduct themselves as chiefs, which led to a change of the chiefs' evaluation system, using those seven "Guiding Principles" as benchmarks for grading criteria in chiefs' performance.

Retirement
On 7 November 2008, Campa announced his plans to step down as MCPON on 12 December 2008 and to retire on 1 April 2009. On 5 December 2008, Fleet Master Chief Rick D. West was announced as the 12th MCPON. Campa received the Navy Distinguished Service Medal during his retirement ceremony.

Awards and decorations

 Campa earned 7 service stripes.

See also

 Hispanics in the United States Navy

External links

 
 MCPON, departing: Campa to retire

Year of birth missing (living people)
Living people
People from Lynwood, California
People from the San Fernando Valley
Master Chief Petty Officers of the United States Navy
Excelsior College alumni
Naval War College alumni
Recipients of the Navy Distinguished Service Medal